Abdul Jabbar Rahima (born 1 July 1954) is an Iraqi hurdler. He competed in the men's 110 metres hurdles at the 1980 Summer Olympics.

References

1954 births
Living people
Athletes (track and field) at the 1980 Summer Olympics
Iraqi male hurdlers
Olympic athletes of Iraq
Place of birth missing (living people)